Between the Sheets may refer to:

Music 
 Between the Sheets (The Isley Brothers album), 1983
 "Between the Sheets" (song), the title song
 Between the Sheets (The 411 album), 2004
 Between the Sheets (Fourplay album), 1993
 "Between the Sheets", a song by Alexandra Burke from Heartbreak on Hold

Other media 
 Between the Sheets (TV series), a 2003 British miniseries
 Between the Sheets (film), a 2003 American film by Michael DeLuise
 Between the Sheets (manga), a manga by Erica Sakurazawa
 Between the Sheets (play), a 2012 Canadian one-act drama play by Jordi Mand
 Between the Sheets, a Critical Role Productions talk show hosted by Brian W. Foster

Other uses 
 Between the sheets (cocktail), an alcoholic drink using rum and cognac
 Sexual intercourse, as such action often takes place within bed sheets